Mauricio Romero Alvizu (born February 2, 1983, in León, Guanajuato) is a Mexican former footballer.

Career
Romero has played for several teams including Monarcas Morelia, Tigres UANL, Querétaro F.C., Atlante F.C. and Tiburones Rojos de Veracruz. He is well known for his outstanding performance in the Primera Division A with giants as Club Necaxa and Club Leon having scored more than 40 goals in just 4 tournaments.

Romero led Veracruz to the 2010 Primera A playoffs, but missed out on the final match against Club Tijuana through injury.

Statistics

References

External links

1983 births
Living people
Atlas F.C. footballers
Atlante F.C. footballers
Atlético Morelia players
Tigres UANL footballers
Club Necaxa footballers
C.D. Veracruz footballers
Club León footballers
Footballers from Guanajuato
Sportspeople from León, Guanajuato
Mexican footballers
Association football forwards